Phú Phong may refer to several places in Vietnam, including:

 Phú Phong, Bình Định, a township and capital of Tây Sơn District.
 , a rural commune of Hương Khê District.
 , a rural commune of Châu Thành District.